Georges-Mathieu de Durand (died 1997) was a Canadian Dominican specialized in patristics and Christology.

A professor at the University of Montreal, he is particularly known for his contributions to the Sources Chrétiennes collection. He published alone or in collaboration 13 bilingual volumes, relating particularly to the Trinity (Hilary, De Trinitate; Basil, Contra Eunomium; and Cyril of Alexandria, De Trinitate Dialogi) and to Christology (Cyril of Alexandria, De Incarnatione, Quod Unus Sit Christus).

He was working on Nemesius of Emesa's De Natura Hominis at the time of his death.

Year of birth missing
Patristic scholars
1997 deaths